KSWP (90.9 FM) is a radio station broadcasting a Contemporary Christian music format. Licensed to Lufkin, Texas, United States, the station serves the Lufkin-Nacogdoches area.  The station is currently owned by Lufkin Educational Broadcasting Foundation and features programming from Salem Communications and USA Radio Network.

References

External links
 
 

SWP
Radio stations established in 1975